Livingstone Clement Sargeant (born 15 April 1947 in Cotton Ground, Nevis), is a former West Indian cricketer who played for the Combined Islands and the Leeward Islands in the 1960s and the 1970s.

References

External links

1947 births
Living people
Nevisian cricketers
Combined Islands cricketers
Leeward Islands cricketers
People from Saint Thomas Lowland Parish